Sajna Wielka  (German Schrankheim) is a village in the administrative district of Gmina Korsze, within Kętrzyn County, Warmian-Masurian Voivodeship, in northern Poland.

References

Sajna Wielka